The People's Movement of Kosovo was a political party in Kosovo active after the Kosovo War, having originally been founded as a political movement of Albanian nationalists in 1982.
Despite participating in several elections in autonomous Kosovo, its pre-war existence was its most historically significant period. Historically, its support and membership came from Albanian diaspora, especially within Switzerland and Germany, originating mainly from former Yugoslav republics.

Ideology
The LPK was formed in the early 1980s, during the turmoil which would bring the Albanian population of Yugoslavia to wider attention. During the 1981 protests in Kosovo, protesters demanded that Kosovo become a republic within the Socialist Federal Republic of Yugoslavia.

The movement was crystallized on Feb 17th, 1982, in Switzerland, as a Marxist-Leninist union of Albanian diaspora organizations with support and sympathy for/from the communist regime of Enver Hoxha, struggling for the rights of Albanians throughout Yugoslavia and unification with Albania, originally named the Movement for an Albanian republic in Yugoslavia, to be renamed later as PMK.

The LPK's ideology was left-wing nationalism. Peter Schwarz, while talking about Kosovo Liberation Army (UÇK) in "Kosovo and the crisis in the Atlantic Alliance", (Sep, 1st, 1999), states: "In Germany a ban was in the course of being implemented against the core of the party, the Enver Hoxha-oriented KPM (Kosovo People's Movement)". Robert Elsie states in his Historical Dictionary of Kosovo, 2011 that: "It was initially Marxist-oriented, seeing Kosovo's salvation in Albania and thus supporting the regime of Enver Hoxha".
The Marxist–Leninist orientation was necessary in order to achieve support from Albania, and was abandoned after fall of communism in Albania.

Foundation
The three core organizations that constituted the LPK were the Marxist–Leninist Communist Party of Albanians in Yugoslavia, the National Liberation Movement of Kosovo and Other Albanian Regions and the Marxist–Leninist Organization of Kosovo. The negotiations had started on late November 1981, failing for the first time in Istanbul between Sabri Novosella and Abdullah Prapashtica despite the support of Albanian Ambassador in Turkey. The movement's platform would be based on that of the more moderate PKMLSHJ, shifted aimed for an Albanian Republic within Yugoslavia, while the other two organizations had the goal of unifying Kosovo with Albania.

There is some controversy regarding the exact identity of the founders of the LPK. One of its founders, Abdullah Prapashtica, has stated that the movement's executive committee included Osman Osmani, Faton Topalli, Ibrahim Kelmendi, Sabri Novosella, Jusuf Gërvalla, Bardhosh Gërvalla, Xhafer Durmishi, Kadri Zeka, Hasan Mala, Xhafer Shatri, and Nuhi Sylejmani (joining after the execution of Gërvalla brothers), while others like Emrush Xhemajli give slightly different names and circumstances.

Activity until 1998
The LPK remained active throughout Europe and continuously sponsored and supported insurgents, propaganda, and activities inside Yugoslavia, as well as lobbying for the Albanian national cause. Many would be imprisoned or killed by Yugoslav authorities. On 17 January 1982, Jusuf Gërvalla, Kadri Zeka and Bardhosh Gërvalla were executed in Untergruppenbach, West Germany from Yugoslav secret service secret agents. Two other members, Rexhep Mala and Nuhi Berisha died in a shoot-out with Yugoslav police forces in a Prishtina neighbourhood (today "Kodra e Trimave") on 11 January 1984. On November 2, 1989, Afrim Zhitia and Fahri Fazliu would die in a similar shoot-out (from 12:45 till around 19:00) after being surrounded by Serbian police in the "Kodra e Diellit" neighborhood of Pristina.

Despite the difficulties, the LPK would diligently continue to be the main representative of the Albanian resistance against Serbian rule until December 1989, when Ibrahim Rugova and other intellectuals in Kosovo founded the Democratic League of Kosovo.

1998–2001
The LPK would establish the core of what would become known as the Kosovo Liberation Army, following later with the UÇPMB in Preševo Valley, the National Liberation Army (UÇK) in North Macedonia, as well as the FBKSh of Gafurr Adili. Many members including most of the leadership would actively join the war, including Adem Jashari, Sami Lushtaku, Fatmir Limaj, Fehmi Lladrovci, Ramush Haradinaj, Azem Syla, Adem Grabovci, Jakup Krasniqi, Ali Ahmeti, and Hashim Thaçi.

Afterwards
On 14-05-1999, most of the LPK membership would support the creation of Democratic Progress of Kosovo (Partia për Progres Demokratik e Kosovës) as a political wing of the Kosovo Liberation Army after the war, renamed on 21-05-2000 as Democratic Party of Kosovo led by Hashim Thaçi. Many others would join other political entities that emerged into Kosovo's political arena, i.e. the Socialist Party of Kosovo, National Movement for the Liberation of Kosovo, Vetëvendosje, etc. The fraction that did not support these changes continued political activity under the same original name (Lëvizja Popullore e Kosovës).

At the last legislative elections, 2001, 2004, 2007 the party won 1 out of 120 seats.

On July 23, 2013, what remained from the LPK merged into Vetëvendosje.

See also
History of Yugoslavia
Albanians in Kosovo
Socialist Autonomous Province of Kosovo
State Security Administration
Kosovo War
List of Kosovo Albanians
List of political parties in Kosovo
Democratic Party of Kosovo
Vetëvendosje

Notes

References

Further reading
Malcolm, Noel. Kosovo: A Short History. Basingstoke: Macmillan, 1998. .
Robert Elsie. Historical Dictionary of Kosovo, 2011. Historical Dictionaries of Europe 79. Scarecrow Press. .
Tim Judah. Kosovo: War and Revenge, 2002. Yale University Press; 2 Sub edition. .
Ian Jeffries. The Former Yugoslavia at the Turn of the Twenty-First Century: A Guide to the Economies in Transition (Routledge Studies of Societies in Transition), 2002, Routledge Chapman & Hall, .
Bedri Islami. I vërteti : (Ali Ahmeti, si e njoha unë) [The real one: Ali Ahmeti, like I knew him], Tringa Design, 2011. 

1982 establishments in Kosovo
1982 establishments in Switzerland
Albanian irredentism
Albanian nationalism in Kosovo
Albanian nationalist parties
Albanian separatism
Communism in Kosovo
Defunct communist parties
Defunct nationalist parties
Defunct political parties in Kosovo
Formerly banned communist parties
Hoxhaist parties
Kosovo Liberation Army
Left-wing nationalist parties
Marxist parties
Modern history of Kosovo
National liberation movements
Political parties established in 1982
Pro-independence parties
Political parties in Yugoslavia
Socialist parties in Kosovo